Gmina Niedrzwica Duża is a rural gmina (administrative district) in Lublin County, Lublin Voivodeship, in eastern Poland.

Villages
Gmina Niedrzwica Duża contains the villages and settlements of Borkowizna, Czółna, Krebsówka, Krężnica Jara, Majdan Sobieszczański, Marianka, Niedrzwica Duża, Niedrzwica Kościelna, Niedrzwica Kościelna-Kolonia, Osmolice-Kolonia, Radawczyk, Radawczyk-Kolonia Pierwsza, Sobieszczany, Sobieszczany-Kolonia, Strzeszkowice Duże, Strzeszkowice Małe, Tomaszówka, Trojaczkowice, Warszawiaki and Załucze.

Neighbouring gminas
Gmina Niedrzwica Duża is bordered by the city of Lublin and by the gminas of Bełżyce, Borzechów, Głusk, Konopnica, Strzyżewice and Wilkołaz.

References

Niedrzwica Duza
Lublin County